The 58th parallel north is a circle of latitude that is 58 degrees north of the Earth's equatorial plane. It crosses Europe, Asia, the Pacific Ocean, North America, and the Atlantic Ocean.

At this latitude the Sun is visible for 18 hours, 11 minutes during the summer solstice and 6 hours, 27 minutes during the winter solstice.

Around the world
Starting at the Prime Meridian and heading eastwards, the parallel 58° north passes through:

{| class="wikitable plainrowheaders"
! scope="col" width="125" | Co-ordinates
! scope="col" | Country, territory or ocean
! scope="col" | Notes
|-
| style="background:#b0e0e6;" | 
! scope="row" style="background:#b0e0e6;" | North Sea
| style="background:#b0e0e6;" |
|-
| 
! scope="row" | 
| Markøy and Austre Seli, Vest-Agder
|-
| style="background:#b0e0e6;" | 
! scope="row" style="background:#b0e0e6;" | Atlantic Ocean
| style="background:#b0e0e6;" | North Sea
|-
| 
! scope="row" | 
|-
| style="background:#b0e0e6;" | 
! scope="row" style="background:#b0e0e6;" | Atlantic Ocean
! scope="row" style="background:#b0e0e6;" | SkagerrakPassing between Våre Island to the north and Udvåre Island to the south, Vest-Agder
|-
| 
! scope="row" | 
| Hille Island, Vest-Agder
|-
| style="background:#b0e0e6;" | 
! scope="row" style="background:#b0e0e6;" | Atlantic Ocean
! scope="row" style="background:#b0e0e6;" | Skagerrak
|-
| 
! scope="row" | 
| Skjernøy Island, Vest-Agder
|-
| style="background:#b0e0e6;" | 
! scope="row" style="background:#b0e0e6;" | Atlantic Ocean
! scope="row" style="background:#b0e0e6;" | SkagerrakPassing south of Uvår and Songvår Islands, Vest-Agder
|-
| 
! scope="row" | 
| Tjörn Island, Västra Götaland County
|-
| style="background:#b0e0e6;" | 
! scope="row" style="background:#b0e0e6;" | Atlantic Ocean
! scope="row" style="background:#b0e0e6;" | Hakefjorden
|-
| 
! scope="row" | 
| Västra Götaland County, Lake Vättern (southernmost point of Visingsö), Jönköping County, Östergötland County, Kalmar County
|-
| style="background:#b0e0e6;" | 
! scope="row" style="background:#b0e0e6;" | Atlantic Ocean
| style="background:#b0e0e6;" | Baltic SeaPassing just north of the islands of Gotland and Fårö, 
|-
| 
! scope="row" | 
| Island of Saaremaa, Saare County
|-
| style="background:#b0e0e6;" | 
! scope="row" style="background:#b0e0e6;" | Atlantic Ocean
| style="background:#b0e0e6;" | Gulf of Riga, Baltic Sea
|-
| 
! scope="row" | 
| Pärnu County
|-
| 
! scope="row" | 
| For , Valmiera District
|-
| 
! scope="row" | 
| For , Viljandi County
|-
| 
! scope="row" | 
| For , Valmiera District
|-
| 
! scope="row" | 
| Viljandi County, Valga County and Põlva County
|-
| 
! scope="row" | 
| Northwestern, Central, Volga, Ural Federal Districts, Krasnoyarsk Krai, Irkutsk Oblast, Zabaykalsky Krai, Zabaykalsky Krai, Yakutia, Khabarovsk KraiPassing through Perm and Ust-Ilimsk
|-
| style="background:#b0e0e6;" | 
! scope="row" style="background:#b0e0e6;" | Pacific Ocean
| style="background:#b0e0e6;" | Sea of Okhotsk
|-
| 
! scope="row" | 
| Kamchatka Peninsula, Kamchatka Krai
|-
| style="background:#b0e0e6;" | 
! scope="row" style="background:#b0e0e6;" | Pacific Ocean
| style="background:#b0e0e6;" | Bering Sea
|-
| 
! scope="row" | 
| Alaska - Alaska Peninsula
|-
| style="background:#b0e0e6;" | 
! scope="row" style="background:#b0e0e6;" | Pacific Ocean
| style="background:#b0e0e6;" | Shelikof Strait, Gulf of Alaska
|-
| 
! scope="row" | 
| Alaska - Raspberry Island and Afognak Island
|-
| style="background:#b0e0e6;" | 
! scope="row" style="background:#b0e0e6;" | Pacific Ocean
| style="background:#b0e0e6;" | Gulf of Alaska
|-
| 
! scope="row" | 
| Alaska - Yakobi Island, Chichagof Island, Admiralty Island and the mainland
|-valign="top"
| 
! scope="row" | 
| British Columbia, Alberta, Saskatchewan, Manitoba
|-
| style="background:#b0e0e6;" | 
! scope="row" style="background:#b0e0e6;" | Arctic Ocean
| style="background:#b0e0e6;" | Hudson Bay
|-valign="top"
| 
! scope="row" | 
| Quebec, Newfoundland and Labrador
|-
| style="background:#b0e0e6;" | 
! scope="row" style="background:#b0e0e6;" | Atlantic Ocean
| style="background:#b0e0e6;" |
|-
| 
! scope="row" | 
| Island of Lewis and Harris, 
|-
| style="background:#b0e0e6;" | 
! scope="row" style="background:#b0e0e6;" | The Minch
| style="background:#b0e0e6;" |
|-
| 
! scope="row" | 
| 
|-
| style="background:#b0e0e6;" | 
! scope="row" style="background:#b0e0e6;" | North Sea
| style="background:#b0e0e6;" |
|}

Climate
In general, this parallel sees significant differences in temperature and precipitation with proximity to warm ocean currents. The moderation from the Gulf Stream ensures a moderate oceanic climate in much of Western Europe and on the immediate coastline of Alaska, whereas moving inland on continental masses, subarctic climates predominate as the dark winters dominate the temperature cycle. In the transitional area centred on the Baltic Sea this latitude sees a humid continental climate with warm summers and snowy winters somewhat below freezing.

Where cold ocean currents dominate such as near Hudson Bay the climate is polar, rendering in severe winter conditions and very subdued summers. This type of climate is seen in the surroundings of Inukjuak in Quebec, Canada, where the sea ice eliminates winter moderation, but the thawing of the cold water renders in very cool summers as well. In more continental cold areas such as these winters commonly go below  even during the day. Further west in inland areas winters are often as severe, but summers average above , similar to the Baltic region where climates are much gentler.

See also
57th parallel north
59th parallel north
58th parallel south

References

n58